This is a list of musicians and musical groups from Liberia. Only notable individuals appear here.

Musical groups 

Soulful Dynamics - German-based band
Soul Fresh - Hipco musical duo 
Zack & Geebah - 1980s musical duo

Musicians

2C - U.S-based singer 
Agnes Nebo von Ballmoos - composer and music professor
MC Caro - rapper and singer 
Benji Cavalli - U.S-based singer 
Christoph The Change - rapper and songwriter
Cralorboi CIC - Hipco singer
Sundaygar Dearboy - Hipco and gospel singer
DenG - Afropop singer
Miatta Fahnbulleh - singer and social activist
George Fraska - vocalist and guitarist 
Wesseh Freeman - singer and guitarist
Faithvonic - singer and songwriter
Fatu Gayflor - singer and songwriter
Eddie Johns - singer and songwriter
Kobazzie - singer and songwriter 
Kpanto - singer and songwriter 
Billema Kwillia - composer and music teacher
Knero Lapaé - Hip-hop and Afrobeats singer
Irene Logan - Liberian-Ghanaian singer
Olmstead Luca - pianist and composer
Dawn Padmore - classical singer
Bucky Raw - rapper and songwriter
Tecumsay Roberts - singer and dancer
Scientific - rapper and songwriter
Takun J - rapper and activist
Tokay Tomah - singer and activist
Joe Woyee - singer and drummer

References

 
Liberian